Look at Life was a regular British series of short documentary films of which over 500 were produced between 1959 and 1969 by the Special Features Division of the Rank Organisation for screening in their Odeon and Gaumont cinemas. The films always preceded the main feature film that was being shown in the cinema that week. It replaced the circuit's newsreel, Universal News, which had become increasingly irrelevant in the face of more immediate news media, particularly on television with the launch of ITN on the Independent Television service, which began broadcasting in parts of the United Kingdom in 1955.

Presentation
Produced on 35mm film and in Eastmancolor, these ten-minute 'featurettes' melded a light-hearted magazine format with a more in depth documentary approach and depicted aspects of life, mainly in Britain, but sometimes further afield. The films often depicted elements of the 'push button' or 'jet age', demonstrating advances in technology and a reflection on the changing tastes, fashions and trends representative of the so-called 'swinging sixties' era, which were often portrayed in a glossy, vibrant and optimistic way. The films also reported on topical issues that were affecting modern day society such as road safety, civil defence and pollution, and often sought to explain the rapid changes that were taking place in the country in an entertaining and informative narrative. Look at Life also took its cameras abroad to focus on events and affairs within the Commonwealth and British colonies including Aden, Gibraltar and the ever diminishing British controlled areas of Africa. Look at Life cameras were also offered exclusive access behind the Iron Curtain to present life in the Eastern Bloc, particularly in East Berlin and the Soviet Union.

The films were generally narrated in the style typical of newsreel films with a principal voice-over while letting the images tell the story. The narration was generally spoken over the natural sounds of the subject being discussed such as motor traffic or the activities within a workplace and with musical accompaniment. People who were featured in the programmes were seldom heard to speak unless as background sound, their activities and interactions with others generally being commented upon by the narrator. Otherwise the subject of the film or clip would sometimes address the camera directly or perform in a given situation, both in a staged and a scripted manner whereby the narrator could often add a humorous or ironic comment in the context of the subject.

On occasions an expert or professional in the field of the subject such as inventor of the Hovercraft Christopher Cockerell could be watched presenting the film directly to camera and providing the voiceovers. In the most part narration of the films was provided by well known celebrities and presenters of the time including Raymond Baxter, Eamonn Andrews, Wynford Vaughan-Thomas, Michael Ingrams, Antony Bilbow, Sid James and Martin Jarvis in later editions. James Bond’s Island was narrated by voice actor Peter Hawkins. However the majority of the films were narrated by actor Tim Turner.

In the early years at the end of each film the caption "Take a Look at Life Again Soon" would appear on screen.

Reception
When the first issue of Look at Life, "Marrakesh" was released in March 1959, it was hailed in the trade journals as an "exciting venture in film journalism" and Rank announced this innovation would have "a more lasting impact than the present ephemeral newsreel content". Look at Life was a popular formula but did become rather frozen in time with its light-hearted presentation and jaunty theme tune and despite subtle changes to the opening titles, their graphics and the introduction of the Rank 'gong' logo at the beginning of later films. Television led audiences into a documentary world that had more grit and less glamour than the relative escapism of the cinema and by 1969 Rank could no longer ensure the survival of the series and the concept waned just as other newsreels and magazine films also available at that time, such as the Pathé Pictorial which was shown on the rival ABC cinema circuit, and as cinema audience continued to decline rapidly on the verge of the 1970s.

Public Releases
Over 500 episodes were produced altogether. Digitally restored from the original film elements, the Look at Life series is now licensed by ITV Studios Global Entertainment, previously known on screen as Granada Ventures and distributed by the Network imprint. Many of the films have not been seen in full since their original screenings in the cinemas, although a number of films have been previously released on Super 8 and on DVD in themed categories. These include Look at Life – Swingin' London, which explores elements of contemporary London life, work and traditions and Look at Life – On the Railways, which represented the great changes that were taking place to Britain's railways in the wake of the modernisation programme and the decline of steam. However Network has gradually released box-sets of the films over eight volumes, containing a total of 499 films. 

Volume 1: "Transport" is a four disc compilation released in 2010 and contains 54 films on the theme of transport. Look at Life Volume 2: "Military" containing 45 films on three discs was released in June 2011, whilst Volume 3: "Science" containing 45 films on three discs was released in September 2011.

Two further volumes, Volume 4: "Sport" containing 42 films on three discs and Volume 5: "Cultural Heritage" containing 64 films on four discs were for release in August and November 2012 respectively. Volume 6: "World Affairs" containing 72 films on five discs was released on 1 February 2013. On 10 August 2015, a seventh volume Volume 7: "Business and Industry" containing 60 films on three discs was released.

The final 7 disc Volume 8: People and Places presenting a remaining 117 films on seven discs was released in the spring of 2021.

In November 2012, the series Britain on Film commissioned by BBC Scotland for broadcast on BBC Four began a twenty-part series providing an insight into life in Britain in the 1960s exclusively featuring footage from the Look at Life series. Distributed by ITN Source, a partly owned subsidiary of ITV Plc, each episode features a different aspect of British life and culture during the decade, including the changing role of women and how leisure time was spent including the rising popularity of overseas travel. It is presented with original commentary from the series with captions to provide the contemporary viewer with explanation.

Available on DVD

Volume 1: Transport

Disc 1 (1959–1960)

Disc 2 (1960–1963)

Disc 3 (1963–1965)

Disc 4 (1965–1969)

Volume 2: Military

Disc 1 (1960–1961)

Disc 2 (1961–1964)

Disc 3 (1964–1969)

Volume 3: Science

Disc 1 (1959–1963)

Disc 2 (1963–1964)

Disc 3 (1964–1969)

Volume 4: Sport

Disc 1

Disc 2

Disc 3

Volume 5: Cultural Heritage

Disc 1

Disc 2

Disc 3

Disc 4

Volume 6: World Affairs

Disc 1

Disc 2

Disc 3

Disc 4

Disc 5

Volume 7: Business and Industry

Disc 1

Disc 2

Disc 3

Volume 8: People and Places

Disc 1

Disc 2

Disc 3

Disc 4

Disc 5

Disc 6

Disc 7

References 

British short documentary films
1960s short documentary films
1960s English-language films